Rosalia Maggio (1 May 1921 – 25 July 1995) was an Italian actress, dancer, singer and showgirl.

Biography 
Born in Palermo, she was the daughter of two comedian actors and sister of actors Enzo, Dante, Beniamino and Pupella Maggio. She debuted at 5 years old as a child actress. Maggio appeared widely in films, theatrical plays, radio dramas, revues, sceneggiate, and operetta. She died of cancer in Naples at 75.

Selected filmography

Film 
1936: The Two Sergeants – (uncredited)
1954: Desiderio 'e sole – Aunt Clara Di Capua
1954: Letter from Naples – Concetta
1955: Tragic Ballad – cameriera casa Accardi
1956: Te stò aspettanno
1958: Toto, Peppino and the Fanatics – Anita
1958: Carosello di canzoni – Signora Concetta Apicella
1959: Fantasmi e ladri
1961: Revenge of the Conquered
1961: Day by Day, Desperately – Adele
1962: Roaring Years – Donna Nunzia Acquamano
1962: The Four Days of Naples – Scared Woman (uncredited)
1963: The Girl from Parma – Iris
1963: La donna degli altri è sempre più bella – Lucia Marcani (segment "La dirittura morale")
1963: Giacobbe, l'uomo che lottò con Dio
1964: I due toreri
1965: Made in Italy – Another Guest (segment "2 'Il Lavoro', episode 2")
1965: Menage all'italiana – Stella's Mother
1972: Don't Torture a Duckling – Mrs. Spriano – Michele's Mother
1974: I guappi – Amalia Scognamiglio
1980: La pagella
1981: I figli... so' pezzi 'e core – Donna Concetta
1981: Nel segno del leone
1985: The Two Lives of Mattia Pascal – Vedova Pescatore
1988: Chiari di luna – Suor Resurrezione

Television 
1964: Michele Settespiriti – Elvira
1987–1993: Eurocops

References

External links 
 

1921 births
Italian film actresses
1995 deaths
Italian stage actresses
Italian television actresses
Deaths from cancer in Campania
20th-century Italian actresses
Actresses from Palermo